Landestheater Tübingen  is a theatre in Baden-Württemberg, Germany. It is known as 'LTT' for short , officially also 'Landestheater Württemberg-Hohenzollern Tübingen Reutlingen', is a cultural enterprise financed in Tübingen by public funds, donations and entrance fees. It puts on its mainly own productions, but also – partly foreign-language – guest performances. In addition to the so-called "evening game plan", it also has its own children's and youth theater division.

The Landestheater performs beyond with its productions for large and small stages, and with the Junge LTT also for kindergartens, classrooms etc.
More than a quarter of its more than 900 performances a year are outside the theatre.

History

The history of the Landestheater Württemberg-Hohenzollern Tübingen Reutlingen dates back to the postwar period. In 1945, the "Städtische Schauspielhaus Tübingen" with the Schiller Hall of a local museum as a venue, a multipurpose room that was also used as a cinema, was created from a free play group. In 1947, the cities of Tübingen and Reutlingen merged to form a "Zweckverband Städtetheater Tübingen Reutlingen". With the support of the former state of Württemberg-Hohenzollern. In 1950, the current state theater emerged. The country's financial participation allowed the theater to hold its own during the critical years following the currency reform, and began to schedule scheduled gaming operations and to produce performances for guest performances in the region. For a long time, however, the theater depended on the museum to use as a venue, which in the long run represented an enormous burden. Workshop, rehearsal and office space were missing, the theater infrastructure was insufficient. Because of the financial crisis, both the considerations for a new theater construction and for an expansion of the museum failed. However, since the space requirement blew up the spatial possibilities of the museum and the fire, construction and industrial police finally considered the game mode no longer responsible,

After the reconstruction of the museum, which started in 1962, failed due to the different interests of the museum owners and the state theater, as well as the lack of government subsidies from the city of Tübingen, the LTT finally began to search for a solution on its own. In 1975, the solo venue was found. A redundant chair factory 'Schäfer', which was vacant at that time, was converted into the LTT headquarters during a four-year planning and construction phase.

On 23 September 1978, the theatre started acting workshops with the German premiere of "Mensch Meier" by Franz Xaver Kroetz. On 21 September 1979, finally, the Great Hall was inaugurated and opened with Friedrich Schiller's "Die Räuber".

Five years later, in 1984, an independent children's and youth theater division was founded at the LTT, today's "Young LTT". It celebrated its 30th anniversary in 2014. Michael Miensopust is its director. It puts on its own junior productions.

Noted productions:
 1982, Hamlet, directed by Pit Drescher 
 1982, The Man of La Mancha, directed by Stefan Viering
 1983, Emilia Galotti (by Gotthold Ephraim Lessing), directed by Marinelli 
 1983, The Opera from the Large Hanggelte, directed by W. Kolneder
 1983, Fazz and Zwoo, directed by W. Fink 
 1983, The Beautiful Helena, directed by Istvan Iglodi
 1983, Jumbo Track, directed by Gunther Möllmann
 1984, The Gull, directed by Brigitte Soubeyrand 
 1984, Measure for Measure (by Shakespeare), directed by Pit Drescher

Intendants (managing directors)

References

Theatres in Baden-Württemberg